French Cuisine (original title: Pension complète) is a 2015 French comedy film directed by Florent Siri and starring Franck Dubosc and Gérard Lanvin. It is a remake of the 1963 French-Italian film La Cuisine au beurre, which was directed by Gilles Grangier.

Cast 
 Franck Dubosc as François
 Gérard Lanvin as Alex
 Pascale Arbillot as Charlotte
 Audrey Dana as Pascale
 Catherine Lachens as Maman François
 Nader Boussandel as Mamed
 Marc Barbé as Franck
 Nora Hamzawi as Victoire Bonnaire
 Abdoulaye Dembele as Brice

References

External links 
 

2015 films
2015 comedy films
2010s French-language films
French comedy films
Remakes of French films
StudioCanal films
2010s French films